Umán Municipality is one of the 106 municipalities in the Mexican state of Yucatán containing  (234.30 km2) of land and located roughly 15 km southwest of the city of Mérida. The word "Umán" means “purchase” in the Yucatec Maya language.

History
There is no accurate data on when the town was founded, though it existed before the conquest and in antiquity belonged to the chieftainship of Ah Canul.  At colonization, Umán became part of the encomienda system with Francisco Hernández recorded as one of the earliest encomenderos.

Yucatán declared its independence from the Spanish Crown in 1821 and in 1825, the area was assigned to the Lower Camino Real with its headquarters in Hunucma Municipality. In 1921, was designated as its own municipality.

Governance
The municipal president is elected for a three-year term. The town council has nine councilpersons, who serve as Secretary and councilors of heritage and sports, policing, education and health, public works, potable water, rural development and social management, roads and markets, nomenclature and recruiting, ecology, public monuments.

Communities
The head of the municipality is Umán, Yucatán.  There are 87 populated areas of the municipality. The most notable include Bolón, Dzibikak, Dzununcán, Itzincab, Oxcum, Oxholón, Poxilá, San Antonio Mulix, Tebec, Xtepen, and Yaxcopoil. The significant populations are shown below:

Local festivals
Every year from 13 to 15 September the town holds a celebration for the Christ of Love.

Tourist attractions
 The ex-convent and Church of St. Francis of Assisi, built in the eighteenth century
 Archaeological sites at Bolon, Hotzus and Kizil 
 Hacienda Xtepén
 Hacienda Yaxcopoil

References

Municipalities of Yucatán